Creag Island is an island in Scotland. It is located in Argyll and Bute council area, in the northwestern part of the country, 600 km northwest of the British capital London.

References

Uninhabited islands of Argyll and Bute